Chaminade can refer to:

People 
William Joseph Chaminade (1761–1850), Catholic priest and founder of the Society of Mary (Marianists)
Cécile Chaminade (1857–1944), French composer and pianist

Organisations 
Educational institutions associated with the Marianists and named for William Joseph Chaminade:
Chaminade University of Honolulu
Chaminade Silverswords, the athletic program of Chaminade University
Chaminade High School in Mineola, New York
Chaminade College Preparatory School (California) in Chatsworth and West Hills, California
Chaminade College Preparatory School (Missouri) in St. Louis, Missouri
Chaminade-Julienne High School in Dayton, Ohio
Chaminade-Madonna College Preparatory School in Hollywood, Florida
Chaminade College School, in Toronto, Canada

Other Uses 
 Chaminade Resort & Spa, located in former Marianist institution in Santa Cruz, California